Leadership Academy can refer to:
African Leadership Academy
China Executive Leadership Academy in Pudong
Community Leadership Academy (Tallahassee, Florida, U.S.)
Leadership Academy West
Los Angeles Leadership Academy
New York City Leadership Academy
Oprah Winfrey Leadership Academy for Girls (South Africa)
Science Leadership Academy